Meng Fan-chao was Taiwanese politician. He served as the Acting Magistrate of Nantou County in 1981.

References

Magistrates of Nantou County